TNT's golf coverage was produced by Turner Sports and consisted of television broadcasts of some of the key professional golf events in the United States. Most recently, TNT had the cable rights to the PGA Championship (with full coverage of the first two rounds and early coverage of the weekend rounds since 1999 after being on sister channel TBS since 1991) under a contract with the PGA of America.

The channel has generally only carried major competitions, as opposed to the other week-to-week tournaments which are under the auspices of the PGA Tour, an organization which is independent of the PGA of America.

History
In the past, TNT owned cable rights to the (British) Open Championship, as well as the Women's British Open and Senior British Open, from 2003 to 2009 (with ABC picking up weekend coverage), replacing (and ultimately being replaced by) ESPN. TNT carried the first two rounds of the PGA Championship through 2019, with Turner having covered the event since 1991, at first on TBS and later TNT. TNT also carried the biennial PGA Tour-managed Presidents Cup from 2000 to 2007; Golf Channel assumed those rights beginning with the 2009 event as part of its overall deal for PGA Tour cable rights. TNT also broadcast the first two rounds of the Target World Challenge from 1999 to 2002, and the first three rounds of the five-round Bob Hope Chrysler Classic from 1995 to 1998, along with other select events.

Beginning in 2004, TNT as well as CBS, began broadcasting the PGA Championship in HDTV, although some cameras used SD widescreen through 2006. Meanwhile, the Open Championship was shown in widescreen SD from 2004 through the end of TNT's run in 2009 (weekend rights-holder ABC was forced to do the same, as only SD widescreen cameras were used by the home BBC broadcast). The 2007 Presidents Cup was mostly in HD, with a handful of SD widescreen cameras also being used (this was the standard setup of weekend rights-holder NBC at the time).

On October 10, 2018, it was announced that ESPN would replace TNT as the PGA Championship's cable partner beginning in 2020, with CBS remaining broadcast television rightsholder. This deal left TNT without any golf coverage.

Scheduled time for Turner coverage by year
British Open
2003-2004: 19 - When TNT took over the cable package for the British Open in 2003, they started providing 2 hours of early morning coverage on both weekend days prior to the start of ABC's air-time.
2005-2006: 20 
2007-2009: 19

PGA Championship
1991-1996: 16 - When TBS took over the cable package for the PGA Championship in 1991, they increased the weekday coverage to 6 hours per day. TBS also added 2 hours of Saturday and Sunday coverage. 
1997: 17 
1998: 17 
1999-2005: 17
2006-2009: 18 
2010: 19 
2011-2013: 18 - Because inclement weather stopped play during the third round of 2012 PGA Championship on Saturday, TNT added coverage starting at 8 a.m. ET on Sunday.

The Match 2 
In May 2020, following the COVID-19 pandemic, TNT gained the rights to “Capital One’s The Match 2: Tiger Woods and Peyton Manning vs. Phil Mickelson and Tom Brady”. The event took place May 24 at the Medalist Golf Club in Hobe Sound, Florida. The regular TNT golf team from the 2019 PGA covered the event, in addition to NBA on TNT analyst Charles Barkley and PGA Tour player Justin Thomas.

TNT had previously produced coverage of the original “The Match” event between Woods and Mickelson in 2018, however that aired only on pay-per-view. Like the original, “The Match 2” featured all players mic’d up, and also provided earpieces to allow the players, from their custom-designed golf carts, to chat with the members of the broadcast booth (including Barkley) who were in the 18th tower.

The telecast, which was delayed slightly by rain, peaked at 6.3 million viewers, and averaged 5.8 million for the afternoon. The 3pm EDT Sunday broadcast was the highest rated and most watched golf event ever to air on a cable channel, meaning the telecast beat every Thursday and Friday round in PGA Tour history including TNT's own coverage of the British Open, PGA Championship, and Presidents Cup.

Former commentators

Play-by-play: Ernie Johnson Jr. (since 1991) - Beginning with the 1995 PGA Championship, Johnson became the primary golf anchor for Turner.
Play-by-play: Brian Anderson - Only for 2019 PGA Championship. 
Analysts: Ian Baker-Finch (since 2007) - Beginning with the 2008 British Open, Baker-Finch took over as lead TNT golf analyst
Bill Macatee from CBS
David Feherty from Golf Channel
On course reporter: Billy Kratzert (since 2009)
Interviews: Vince Cellini (since 2012)
Jim Huber (2000-2011)
Verne Lundquist (1995-1997, 2006, 2011) - During the 2006 PGA Championship, Lundquist filled in on TNT for Ernie Johnson, Jr., who was undergoing chemotherapy. During TNT's Sunday coverage of the 2011 PGA Championship, Lundquist once again stepped in for Johnson after Johnson's father died.  On both occasions, Lundquist was already on-site as a tower announcer for CBS's coverage.
Craig Sager (1991-1999) - Sager was the main golf interviewer and essayist during the early years of Turner's coverage.
Mike Tirico (2006) - During the 2006 Open Championship, Tirico filled in for Ernie Johnson, Jr., who was undergoing chemotherapy.  Tirico was also hosting ABC's coverage that week, leading to 11-hour shifts for him.
Matt Winer

TBS era (1991-1998):
Gary Bender 
Mary Bryan - For the 1996 PGA Championship, former LPGA player Bryan moved over from CBS to join the TBS team.
Donna Caponi 
Bobby Clampett - By the 1996 PGA Championship, Clampett once again assumed the lead Turner analyst role, having previously served in that capacity in 1991. When TNT took over the Thursday and Friday rounds of the British Open from ESPN beginning in 2003, Clampett anchored the TNT coverage (which also used some the ABC announcers) with Ernie Johnson, Jr. 
Pat Haden 
David Leadbetter - For the 1992 PGA Championship, TBS installed Leadbetter as its lead analyst. Gary Bender and MLB analyst Don Sutton were also part of the TBS crew. 
Dave Marr - Marr served as the lead analyst for TBS during their 1995 PGA Championship coverage.
Bob Neal - For the 1991 PGA Championship, Neal and Bobby Clampett (as previously mentioned) anchored the TBS coverage. TBS also used golf instructor David Leadbetter, former LPGA player Donna Caponi, and NFL analyst Pat Haden for the 1991 PGA Championship coverage.
Vin Scully
Don Sutton

References

External links

TNT.tv: Sports - Golf on TNT
Turner Newsroom: Press Kits: Professional Golf on TNT
TNT Golf Theme
Golf Channel adds Presidents Cup to collection
PGA Championship - Fang's Bites
TNT

TNT (American TV network) original programming
TNT
1999 American television series debuts
2019 American television series endings
2000s American television series
Turner Sports